Puccinia angustata is a plant pathogen that causes rust on plants in the genus Monarda.
 It was first described scientifically in 1873 by American mycologist Charles Horton Peck, who found it growing on the leaves on the sedges Scirpus sylvaticum and S. eriophorum.

See also
List of Puccinia species

References

angustata
Fungi described in 1873
Fungal plant pathogens and diseases
Taxa named by Charles Horton Peck